Thomas E. Leavey (1897-1980) was an American business executive, rancher, and philanthropist.

Early life
Born near Ferndale, Humboldt County, California to Irish immigrants, he attended Santa Clara University and served briefly in the U. S. Army during the final months of World War I. In 1923, he received a bachelor's degree from the Georgetown University School of Law and relocated to Los Angeles two years later.

Career

In 1928, he co-founded the company that became the Farmers Insurance Group with John C. Tyler.

Philanthropy
With his wife, Dorothy Leavey, he established the Thomas and Dorothy Leavey Foundation in 1952.  The Leavey Foundation has donated more than $100 million to support educational, religious, and other institutions.

Death
He died on March 29, 1980, at the age of 82. Dorothy Leavey died in January 1998 at the age of 101.

References

 Dunkley, John.  A History of the Farmers Insurance Group of Companies.  Los Angeles:  Farmers Insurance Group, 1993.
 Brown, Kathi.  Sound Thinking and Lofty Ideals: The First Seventy Five Years of Farmers Insurance.  Los Angeles:  Farmers Insurance Group, 2003.
 ‘Welcome to Old West End’ by James Pegolotti; The Humboldt Historian: Vol. 56, No. 3; Fall, 2008.
 “The Personal File of Thomas E. Leavey.” (A brief memoir compiled in the 1970s and preserved in the Thomas E. Leavey Archives.)

External links
 history of Farmers Insurance Group at their website  accessed 2010-12-05.
 obituary of Dorothy Leavey in LA Times Jan. 9, 1998.  Retrieved 2010-12-05.

1897 births
1980 deaths
People from Ferndale, California
People from Los Angeles County, California
Georgetown University alumni
Zurich Insurance Group
20th-century American philanthropists